Marika is a given name and surname.

Marika may also refer to:

 Marika (film), a 1938 Hungarian comedy drama
 Marika (singer) (Marta Kosakowska, born 1980), a Polish vocalist
 Marika, Hunters Hill, a house in New South Wales, Australia
 Marika, a 1984 album by Bonga
 Queen Marika the Eternal, a character in the 2022 FromSoftware video game Elden Ring

See also

 The Truth About Marika, a 2007 Swedish TV series and reality game
 Marikaj, a village in Tirana County, Albania